Seyyed Ayaz (also Romanized as Seyyed Ayāz) is a village in Nasrabad Rural District (Kermanshah Province), in the Central District of Qasr-e Shirin County, Kermanshah Province, Iran. At the 2006 census, its population was 412, in 112 families.

References 

Populated places in Qasr-e Shirin County